Latiya is a village in the district of Siddharth Nagar, Uttar Pradesh, India.

References

Villages in Siddharthnagar district